The 2007–08 NCAA Division I men's basketball season began on November 5, 2007 ended with the 2008 NCAA Division I men's basketball tournament's championship game on April 7, 2008, in the Alamodome in San Antonio, Texas.

Season headlines 
 Behind Mario Chalmers' clutch three-pointer at the end of regulation, the Kansas Jayhawks won an overtime battle against the Memphis Tigers to take their third NCAA tournament title, twenty years after Danny Manning led the Jayhawks to their last championship. Bill Self sheds the title of "best coach never to go to a Final Four" in dramatic fashion.
 For the first time since teams were seeded for the NCAA Tournament, all four number one seeds advanced to the Final Four.
 In February, Kelvin Sampson agreed to a buyout and was relieved of his duties as coach of Indiana University following a recruiting scandal concerning impermissible phone calls. Dan Dakich was named interim coach, but the damage had been done as the Hoosiers (ranked No. 14 at the time Sampson was fired) go 3–4 the rest of the season and bow out to Arkansas in a listless performance in the first round of the NCAA tournament. After the season, IU hired Marquette coach Tom Crean to tackle the major rebuilding job ahead.
 Sophomore Stephen Curry put on a shooting display as the Davidson Wildcats upset Gonzaga, Georgetown and Wisconsin - then narrowly succumbed to eventual champion Kansas 59–57 - to go to their first Elite Eight since 1969. Curry scored 40, 30, 33 and 25 points in the four games and was named the Midwest Region Most Outstanding Player.
 North Carolina's Tyler Hansbrough and Kansas State's Michael Beasley engaged in a season-long battle for National player of the year honors. Hansbrough swept the POY awards, while Beasley won all Freshman of the Year awards and joined Hansbrough as a unanimous first-team All-American.
 Memphis flirted with being the first undefeated team since 1976. They started the season 26–0, but on February 23 cross-state rival Tennessee defeated the Tigers 66–62 on Memphis' home floor in a battle of the #1 and #2 teams. The Tigers finished the season 38–2, setting a single-season record for wins. However, all 38 wins were vacated by the NCAA in 2009, due to an invalid SAT score for star Derrick Rose.
 After beating Memphis, Tennessee attained the #1 ranking for the first time in school history. They lost their next game at Vanderbilt.
 The preseason AP All-American team was named on November 5. Tyler Hansbrough of North Carolina was the leading vote-getter (71 of 72 votes). The rest of the team included Roy Hibbert of Georgetown (62 votes), Chris Lofton of Tennessee (61), Drew Neitzel of Michigan State (31) and Darren Collison of UCLA (31).
 The Drake Bulldogs — picked in the preseason to finish ninth in the 10-team Missouri Valley Conference — had a dream season, starting 13–0, finishing 28–5 - and were ranked as high as #14 at one point during the season. Drake's charge was led by an unlikely hero — senior point guard Adam Emmenecker, a three-year walk-on who would go on to capture both the MVC's regular-season and tournament Most Valuable Player awards.
 On February 4, career coaching wins leader Bob Knight retired as head coach of Texas Tech, handing the reins to his son Pat. Knight would reappear as a studio host for ESPN in the postseason.
 A severe storm ripped a hole in the Georgia Dome, wreaking havoc on the SEC tournament. After game delays and a venue change, the Georgia Bulldogs scored an unlikely championship run that included winning two games in one day.
 At Arizona, coach Lute Olson took an unexpected leave of absence just prior to the season's start. Kevin O'Neill, assistant coach and supposed Olson successor, was named interim coach. Olson announced he would return for 2008–09 and did not retain O'Neill on his staff as rumors of a disagreement between the two swirled.
 The first College Basketball Invitational was held, offering a post-season alternative to teams not selected for the NCAA tournament or NIT. Tulsa defeats Bradley in a best of three series to take the inaugural title.
 Wake Forest head coach Skip Prosser died at 56 of an apparent heart attack the July before the season began. Assistant Dino Gaudio was named successor and led the Deacons through an emotional year punctuated by an upset of Duke.
 Lester Hudson of Tennessee-Martin recorded the first-ever quadruple-double in NCAA history. Against Central Baptist College, Hudson scored 25 points, grabbed 12 rebounds, dished out 10 assists and recorded 10 steals in a 116–74 win.
 On January 23, Baylor beat Texas A&M 116–110 in five overtimes in the season's longest (and perhaps wildest) game.
 Houston's Rob McKiver scored 52 points (including seven three-pointers) in a game against Southern Mississippi to set the single-game scoring high for the season.
 Stephen Curry broke the NCAA record for three-pointers made in a season, connecting on 162. The previous record had been held by Butler's Darrin Fitzgerald set in 1987.
 Mike Krzyzewski, and Eddie Sutton each won their 800th career games.
 North Carolina's Tyler Hansbrough, Tennessee's Chris Lofton, Vanderbilt's Shan Foster, Virginia's Sean Singletary, Western Kentucky's Courtney Lee, Utah State's Jaycee Carroll, Colorado's Richard Roby, UNC Greensboro's Kyle Hines, High Point's Arizona Reid, Rider's Jason Thompson, Hofstra's Antoine Agudio, New Orleans' Bo McCalebb and VMI's Reggie Williams all eclipsed the career 2000-point mark during the season.
 Effective this season, the Mid-Continent Conference changed its name to The Summit League.
 Presbyterian, Cal State Bakersfield, Florida Gulf Coast, South Carolina Upstate and North Carolina Central, all moved up to Division I competition.
 Conference realignments: IPFW, North Dakota State and South Dakota State began play in the Summit League, while UC Davis competed in the Big West Conference for the first time. All four programs were independent in 2006–07. Valparaiso began play in the Horizon League after leaving the Summit League. Florida Gulf Coast and South Carolina Upstate joined the Atlantic Sun Conference.
 Charles Barkley, Arnie Ferrin, Danny Manning, Billy Packer, Jim Phelan, Nolan Richardson and Dick Vitale were inducted into the College Basketball Hall of Fame.
 Billy Packer announced his last Final Four after 34 years of broadcasting the event.

Major rule changes 
Beginning in 2007–08, the following rules changes were implemented:
 During free throws, eliminated the first lane space nearest the basket on each side of the lane and used the second, third and fourth lane space on each side as an alignment for free throws. This rule had been used in NCAA women's basketball since the 2001–02 season.
 Use of courtside monitor allowed for determining whether a flagrant foul occurred or to assess the situation during a fight.

Season outlook

Pre-season polls 

The top 25 from the AP and ESPN/USA Today Coaches Polls November 5, 2007.

Conference membership changes 

These schools joined new conferences for the 2007–08 season.

Regular season

Conference winners and tournaments 
Thirty athletic conferences each end their regular seasons with a single-elimination tournament. The teams in each conference that win their regular season title are given the number one seed in each tournament. The winners of these tournaments receive automatic invitations to the 2008 NCAA Division I men's basketball tournament. The Ivy League doesn't have a conference tournament, and Cornell, who won the regular season title, received their automatic invitation.

Major upsets

Regular season and conference tournaments 
 Oakland 68, Oregon 62
 Gardner-Webb 84, Kentucky 68
 Robert Morris 57, Boston College 51
 Winthrop 76, Miami (FL) 71
 Dayton 80, Pittsburgh 55
 Maryland 82, North Carolina 80
 Kentucky 72, Tennessee 66
 Wake Forest 86, Duke 73
 Washington 71, UCLA 61

NCAA tournament 
 #13 San Diego 70, #4 Connecticut 69 (OT)
 #13 Siena 83, #4 Vanderbilt 64
 #10 Davidson 74, #2 Georgetown 70
 #10 Davidson 73, #3 Wisconsin 56
 #12 Western Kentucky 101, #5 Drake 99 (OT)

Statistical leaders

Conference standings

Post-season tournaments

NCAA tournament 

The NCAA Tournament tipped off on March 18, 2008 with the opening round game in Dayton, Ohio, and concluded on April 7 at the Alamodome in San Antonio, Texas. Of the 65 teams that were invited to participate, 31 were automatic bids while 34 were at-large bids. The 34 at-large teams came from 10 conferences, with the Big East tying its own 2006 record with eight bids. Three other conferences, the Big 12, Pac-10, and SEC, had six teams invited to the tournament. Notably absent from the field were Florida and Ohio State, the champions and runners-up of the 2007 tournament, the first time that both teams from a previous year's finals failed to make the tournament since 1980. Kansas defeated Memphis, 75–68 in overtime to win their third NCAA Tournament championship, and Jayhawks guard Mario Chalmers was named the tournament's Most Outstanding Player.

Final Four – Alamodome, San Antonio, Texas

National Invitation tournament 

After the NCAA Tournament field was announced, the National Invitation Tournament invited teams to participate. Eight teams were given automatic bids for winning their conference regular seasons, and 24 other teams were also invited. The field came from 10 conferences, with the Atlantic 10 having the most teams invited with four. The Atlantic Coast and Missouri Valley Conferences each had three bids, and five other conferences placed two teams in the tournament. Last year's NCAA finalists, Ohio State and Florida both made the semifinals, with the Buckeyes winning the tournament, defeating UMass 92–85 in the final. Ohio State center Kosta Koufos was named tournament MVP.

NIT semifinals and final 
Played at Madison Square Garden in New York City on April 1 and 3

College Basketball Invitational 

The inaugural College Basketball Invitational (CBI) Tournament was held starting March 18 and ended with a best-of-three final which saw Tulsa defeat Bradley for the championship. Jerome Jordan of Tulsa was named tournament MVP.

Award winners

Consensus All-American teams

Major player of the year awards 

 Wooden Award: Tyler Hansbrough, North Carolina
 Naismith Award: Tyler Hansbrough, North Carolina
 Associated Press Player of the Year: Tyler Hansbrough, North Carolina
 NABC Player of the Year: Tyler Hansbrough, North Carolina
 Oscar Robertson Trophy (USBWA): Tyler Hansbrough, North Carolina
 Adolph Rupp Trophy: Tyler Hansbrough, North Carolina
 CBS/Chevrolet Player of the Year: Tyler Hansbrough, North Carolina
 Sporting News Player of the Year: Tyler Hansbrough, North Carolina

Major freshman of the year awards 

 USBWA Freshman of the Year: Michael Beasley, Kansas State
 Sporting News Freshman of the Year: Michael Beasley, Kansas State

Major coach of the year awards 

 Associated Press Coach of the Year: Keno Davis, Drake
 Henry Iba Award (USBWA): Keno Davis, Drake
 NABC Coach of the Year: Bob McKillop, Davidson
 Naismith College Coach of the Year: John Calipari, Memphis
 CBS/Chevrolet Coach of the Year: Keno Davis, Drake
 Adolph Rupp Cup: Bruce Pearl, Tennessee
 Sporting News Coach of the Year: Keno Davis, Drake

Other major awards 

 Bob Cousy Award (Best point guard): D. J. Augustin, Texas
 Pete Newell Big Man Award (Best big man): Michael Beasley, Kansas State
 NABC Defensive Player of the Year: Hasheem Thabeet, Connecticut
 Frances Pomeroy Naismith Award (Best player under 6'0): Mike Green, Butler
 Lowe's Senior CLASS Award (top senior): Shan Foster, Vanderbilt
 Robert V. Geasey Trophy (Top player in Philadelphia Big 5): Pat Calathes, St. Joseph's and Mark Tyndale, Temple (Co-MVPs)
 NIT/Haggerty Award (Top player in New York City metro area): Jason Thompson, Rider
 Chip Hilton Player of the Year Award (Strong personal character): Mike Green, Butler

Coaching changes 
A number of teams changed coaches throughout the season and after the season ended.

References